Parshvanatha temple may refer to:

 Parshvanatha temple, Khajuraho in Madhaya Pradesh
 Parsvanath Jain Temple-I in Khandagiri, Odisha
 Parsvanath Jain Temple-II in Khandagiri, Odisha
 Parshvanath Jain temple, Varanasi in Uttar Pradesh